Mordellistena nigrifrons is a species of beetle in the genus Mordellistena of the family Mordellidae. It was described by Ermisch in 1950.

References

Beetles described in 1950
nigrifrons